State Road 606 (NM 606) is a  state highway in the US state of New Mexico. NM 606's southern terminus is at the end of state maintenance at Main Street in Bluewater Village, and the northern terminus is at NM 122 northeast of Bluewater Village.

Major intersections

See also

References

606
Transportation in Cibola County, New Mexico